Honey Bend is an unincorporated community in North Litchfield Township, Montgomery County, Illinois, United States.

References

Unincorporated communities in Montgomery County, Illinois
Unincorporated communities in Illinois